Bob Holt was an American fiddler, playing old-time and for square dances. He was known for his lightning-fast, energetic style of playing. He played his signature song "Ninth of January" at as much as 144 beats per minute while playing for dances.  He was born on November 25, 1930, in Ava, Douglas County, Missouri. He died March 19, 2004, in Ava.

Holt was a recipient of a 1999 National Heritage Fellowship in the amount of $10,000 from the National Endowment for the Arts, which is the United States' highest honor in the folk and traditional arts.

Recordings
 Rabbit in the Pea Patch (cassette tape)
 The Way I Heard It (cassette tape)
 Got a Little Home to Go To  Rounder, 1998 CD 0432
He appears on:
 Jump Fingers, a tape by the Childgrove Country Dancers.
 Face the Creek, a CD produced by the Childgrove Country Dancers.
 Traditional Fiddle Music of the Ozarks: Volume I: Along the Eastern Crescent, Rounder, 1999 (CDROUN0435 / 018964443528) 
 North American Traditions: The Art of Traditional Fiddle  Rounder, 1999

References

External links
 Library of Congress-local legacies
 biography
 autobiography

American fiddlers
People from Ava, Missouri
Musicians from Missouri
2004 deaths
1930 births
Old-time fiddlers
20th-century American violinists
National Heritage Fellowship winners
Rounder Records artists